Ernesto Martens Rebolledo (born January 28, 1933 in Tilapan, Veracruz) is a Mexican chemical engineer, who has occupied several high-profile business positions and was Secretary of Energy during Vicente Fox's government.

He was born in a small town close to the Los Tuxtlas Biosphere Reserve in Veracruz. He received his bachelor's degree in chemical engineering from Tec de Monterrey, Campus Monterrey in 1956, where he met the founder of the school Eugenio Garza Sada. He did postgraduate studies in the Technological Institute of Karlsruhe in Germany and in Harvard Business School .

His first position was with Union Carbide Headquarters where he remained for eighteen years, becoming its CEO.

In 1977, he began with a Monterrey glass company called Vitro, becoming its first non-family CEO in 1985. During his tenure, he expanded the company’s business from glass bottles into plastic containers, suitcases and washing machines with joint ventures with Ford, Corning, Samsonite and Whirlpool. He led Vitro into the U.S. glass market in the early 1980s, when Mexican demand for its products slowed and led to the only hostile takeover of a U.S. company by a Mexican company when Vitro took over Anchor Glass Container Corporation in 1989. However, he made some controversial decisions including a 1992 decision to lay off 3,000 workers, where before the company used to claim that it gave workers “a way of life.”

In 1994, he became president of the board of Cintra (Corporación Internacional de Transporte Aereo), the entity which ran Mexico’s two state airlines, Aeromexico and Mexicana.  He restructured the finances and operations of the two airlines and was credited with saving them.

In 2000, Martens was named  Secretary of Energy by President Vicente Fox, a position which he held until 2003. His nomination by Fox was something of a surprise and Martens had not considered a career in government before. His appointment as energy chief was thought to be last-minute and that Fox might keep his predecessor, Luis Téllez in the position. When he became energy secretary, PEMEX faced problems with the inability to refine oil and gas taken from Mexico’s deposits, selling mostly crude.

Today, Martens is a member of the faculty of the Tec de Monterrey  and the Thunderbird School of Global Management.

References

List of Monterrey Institute of Technology and Higher Education faculty

1933 births
Living people
Harvard University alumni
Mexican Secretaries of Energy
People from Veracruz
National Action Party (Mexico) politicians
Monterrey Institute of Technology and Higher Education alumni
Mexican chemical engineers
Academic staff of the Monterrey Institute of Technology and Higher Education
21st-century Mexican politicians